Angela Khalia Hucles Mangano (born July 5, 1978) is an American sports executive and former professional soccer player. Hucles Mangano is currently the vice president of player development and operations at Angel City FC of the National Women's Soccer League (NWSL), of which she is also a minority owner. As a player, Hucles Mangano played as a midfielder and was a member of the United States women's national soccer team.

Early life
Hucles attended Norfolk Academy where she was a Parade and NSCAA All-American selection in 1995. She was twice named an All-State and All-Region selection in 1994 and 1995. She graduated in 1996 as Norfolk Academy's all-time leading scorer with 204 goals and 106 assists.

University of Virginia
Hucles played college soccer at the University of Virginia, where she was a four-year all-ACC player and tallied 59 goals, including a record 19 game-winners. She is still Virginia's career women's leader in goals, game-winning goals, and total points.

Playing career

Club
After graduating from Virginia in 2000, Hucles played for Hampton Roads Piranhas of the W-League. She led the league in assists with seven, playing in 14 games and scoring six goals.

Hucles was then drafted in the 2001 WUSA Inaugural Draft in the 12th round (93rd overall) by the Boston Breakers of the newly formed Women's United Soccer Association. She went on to make 57 total appearances for the club, scoring six goals. She scored the first goal in the history of the organization on March 6, 2001, in a preseason exhibition against the Duke Blue Devils. In her first season, Hucles appeared in 21 games, starting 19 of them, and finished with two goals and no assists. In 2002, Hucles appeared in 19 games, starting 17, and finished with three goals and four assists. In 2003, Hucles appeared in 17 games, all starts, and scored one goal and assisted on four more. After the 2003 season, the WUSA ceased operations.

Hucles returned to a club in 2005 when she turned out for the Boston Renegades. She only appeared in five games in 2005 but notched three goals and an assist. In 2006, Hucles had a much more productive season, appearing in 11 games and tallying 10 goals and two assists.

In 2008, Women's Professional Soccer was established. Hucles, along with US National Team players Kristine Lilly and Heather Mitts, were allocated to the new Boston Breakers on September 16, 2006. The league kicked off in 2009, which saw Hucles appear in 19 games, all starts, and score two goals and an assist. Following the conclusion of the season, on October 16, 2009, Hucles abruptly announced her retirement from both club and international soccer.

International
With the United States Women's National Team, Hucles won two Olympic gold medals and finished third in two World Cups. She made her first appearance for the United States on April 27, 2002, against Finland. She went on to appear in 109 total matches for the United States, with her last appearance on July 22, 2009, against Canada.

Hucles was a member of the U.S. squad at the 2003 FIFA Women's World Cup but did not play in the tournament due to a shin injury. She was a member of the gold medal-winning United States team for the 2004 Summer Olympics, appearing in two games in Athens. At the 2007 FIFA Women's World Cup, she was a member of the USA squad but did not get any playing time. However, her biggest role with the United States came in the 2008 Summer Olympics in Beijing. Hucles was expected to play a backup role with the squad, but an injury to Abby Wambach forced Hucles into a starting position. She responded by scoring four goals, including two against Japan in the semi-finals. Her efforts helped the United States to the gold medal, and she finished second only to Cristiane in goals scored.

On October 16, 2009, Hucles announced her retirement from both club and international soccer.

Sports and diplomacy
In April 2014, Hucles traveled to Morocco as a SportsUnited Sports Envoy for the U.S. Department of State. In this function, she worked with Lesle Gallimore and Marian Dalmy to conduct soccer clinics and events for 104 youth from under-served areas. In so doing, Hucles helped contribute to SportsUnited's mission to promote greater international understanding and inclusion through sport.

Hucles served as the Women's Sports Foundation President, effective January 1, 2015 to January 2017. She has become a regular speaker on topics of sports leadership, equality, inclusion and safe spaces, anti-bullying, and the power of sport and its impact on personal growth and development. She is a member of the advisory board for You Can Play, a campaign dedicated to fighting homophobia in sports.

See also

 List of footballers with 100 or more caps
 List of Olympic medalists in football
 List of multiple Olympic gold medalists in one event
 List of multiple Olympic gold medalists
 List of 2004 Summer Olympics medal winners
 List of 2008 Summer Olympics medal winners

References

External links
 
 
 
 
 
 
 
 
 WUSA player profile
 

1978 births
Living people
American women's soccer players
African-American women's soccer players
Women's association football midfielders
Boston Breakers (WUSA) players
Boston Breakers players
Virginia Cavaliers women's soccer players
Washington Freedom players
USL W-League (1995–2015) players
United States women's international soccer players
Olympic gold medalists for the United States in soccer
Footballers at the 2004 Summer Olympics
Footballers at the 2008 Summer Olympics
Medalists at the 2008 Summer Olympics
Medalists at the 2004 Summer Olympics
2003 FIFA Women's World Cup players
2007 FIFA Women's World Cup players
FIFA Century Club
Women's Sports Foundation executives
Sportspeople from Virginia Beach, Virginia
Soccer players from Virginia Beach
21st-century African-American sportspeople
21st-century African-American women
20th-century African-American sportspeople
20th-century African-American women
Hampton Roads Piranhas players
Women's Professional Soccer players
Boston Renegades players
Women's United Soccer Association players